Independent Democrats may refer to:

Independent Democrat, an American political designation
Independent Democrats, a political party in South Africa
Independent Democrats (Greece), a defunct political party in Greece
Independent Democrats (Czech Republic), a political party in the Czech Republic
Assembly of Independent Democrats, a political alliance in Iraq